The Magritte Award for Best Flemish Film (French: Magritte du meilleur film flamand) is an award presented annually by the Académie André Delvaux. It is one of the Magritte Awards, which were established to recognize excellence in Belgian cinematic achievements.

The category's original name was Best Flemish Film in Coproduction, but was changed to its current name in 2015 for the 5th Magritte Awards. It was first awarded in 2012, when Best Film in Coproduction was split in Best Foreign Film in Coproduction and Best Flemish Film in Coproduction. As of the 2022 ceremony, La Civil is the most recent winner in this category.

Winners and nominees
In the list below, winners are listed first in the colored row, followed by the other nominees.

2010s

2020s

References

External links
 Magritte Awards official website
 Magritte Award for Best Flemish Film at AlloCiné

2012 establishments in Belgium
Awards established in 2012
Awards for best film
Lists of films by award
Flemish Film in Coproduction